In physics, zilch (or zilches) is a set of ten conserved quantities of the source-free electromagnetic field, which were discovered by Lipkin in 1964.  The name refers to the fact that the zilches are only conserved in regions free of electric charge, and therefore have limited physical significance.  One of the conserved quantities (Lipkin's ) has an intuitive physical interpretation and is also known as optical chirality.

In particular, first, Daniel M. Lipkin observed that if he defined the quantities 

 

then the free Maxwell equations imply that

which implies that the quantity  is constant. This time-independent quantity is known as the zilch, but, more precisely, it is one of the ten zilches discovered by Lipkin (see below). Nowadays, the quantity  is widely known as optical chirality (up to a factor of 1/2). The quantity  is the spatial density of optical chirality, while   is the optical chirality flux. He collectively named these ten conserved quantities the zilch (nowadays, they are also called the zilches) because of the apparent lack of physical significance.

The zilch(es) are often described in terms of the zilch tensor, . The latter can be expressed using the dual electromagnetic tensor  as
.
 The conservation law  means that the following ten quantities are time-independent:
   These are the ten zilches (or just the zilch) discovered by Lipkin. In fact, only nine zilches are independent. The time-independent quantity  is known as the 00-zilch  and is equal to the aforementioned optical chirality . In general, the time-independent quantity  is known as the -zilch  (the indices  run from 0 to 3) and it is clear that there are ten such quantities (nine independent).

It was later demonstrated that Lipkin's zilch is part of an infinite number of zilch-like conserved quantities, a general property of free fields.

One of the zilches has been rediscovered. This is the zilch known as "optical chirality". This name was given by Tang and Cohen since this zilch determines the degree of chiral asymmetry in the rate of excitation of a small chiral molecule by an incident electromagnetic field.
A further physical insight of optical chirality was offered in 2012; optical chirality is to the curl or time derivative of the electromagnetic field what helicity, spin and related quantities are to the electromagnetic field itself.
The physical interpretation of all zilches for topologically non-trivial electromagnetic fields was investigated in 2018.

Since the discovery of the ten zilches in 1964, there is an important open mathematical question concerning their relation with symmetries. (Recently, the full answer to this question seems to have been found ). The question is: 
Until recently, the answer to this question had been given only for the case of optical chirality by Philbin in 2013.
This open question was also emphasized by Aghapour, Andersson and Rosquist in 2020,
while these authors found the symmetries of the duality-symmetric Maxwell action underlying the conservation of all zilches. (Aghapour, Andersson and Rosquist did not find the symmetries of the standard Maxwell action, but they speculated that such symmetries should exist ).
There are also earlier works studying the conservation of zilch in the context of duality-symmetric electromagnetism, but the variational character of the corresponding symmetries was not established.

The full answer to the aforementioned question seems to have been given for the first time in 2022, where the symmetries of the standard Maxwell action underlying the conservation of all zilches were found. According to this work, there is a hidden invariance algebra of free Maxwell equations in potential form that is related to the conservation of all zilches.

See also
 Conservation law
 Noether's theorem

References

Electromagnetism
Conservation laws
Chirality